Glen Fisiiahi (born 2 December 1990)  is a rugby league and rugby union footballer of Tongan and Niue descent.

Background
Fisiiahi was born in Auckland, New Zealand.

Early years
Fisiiahi is from a well known league family that includes the twin brothers Paul and David Fisiiahi. Fisiiahi was an Ellerslie Eagles junior in Auckland Rugby League competitions and represented the Counties Manukau under-18's. Fisiiahi also played rugby union at his high school, Wesley College, and represented the New Zealand Secondary Schools Sevens team. Fisiiahi was the school's sports dux in 2008. While playing for the Junior Warriors Fisiiahi completed a Diploma in Sport and Recreation at AUT University. Fisiiahi made his debut for the New Zealand Warriors' Toyota Cup (Under-20s) team in 2009, playing in three matches. He also played for the Auckland Vulcans in the New South Wales Cup. In 2010 he became one of the stars of the team, scoring 20 tries in 26 matches, and was a part of the 2010 Toyota Cup Grand Final winning team. Fisiiahi was also involved in an embarrassing moment that saw him celebrate a try before scoring, only to be tackled and have the ball knocked out of his hands. Fisiiahi finished his Toyota Cup career with twenty eight appearances and twenty tries. He is eligible for New Zealand, Tonga and Niue. At the end of 2010 Fisiiahi was named in the Junior Kiwis squad that drew a two match series with the Junior Kangaroos.

Rugby league career

2011
After scoring five tries in four trials during the 2011 pre-season, Fisiiahi made his NRL debut for the New Zealand Warriors in Round 1 of the 2011 NRL season against the Parramatta Eels at Eden Park on the wing in the Warriors' 24–18 loss. Fisiiahi being named ahead of Kevin Locke, Krisnan Inu and Bill Tupou. After playing only one NRL match, On 30 March 2011, Fisiiahi signed a four-year deal to keep him at the Warriors until the end of 2015. In Fisiiahi's next match in Round 4 against the Cronulla-Sutherland Sharks at Owen Delany Park at Taupo, Fisiiahi scored his first and second NRL tries in the Warriors 26–18 win. Fisiiahi played in the Auckland Vulcans 30-28 New South Wales Cup Grand Final loss to the Canterbury-Bankstown Bulldogs. Fisiiahi finished his debut year in the NRL with him playing in 4 matches and scoring 2 tries for the Warriors.

2012
Fisiiahi played in 4 matches and scored a try for the Warriors in the 2012 NRL season. In an NSW cup match against the Western Suburbs Magpies, Fisiiahi scored an incredible 6 tries in the Auckland Vulcans 42–20 win.

2013
After Round 19 against the Wests Tigers, Fisiiahi suffered a season ending torn pectoral muscle injury in the Warriors 24–14 win at Leichhardt Oval. Fisiiahi finished the Warriors 2013 NRL season with him playing in 11 matches and scoring 5 tries. Later in the year, Glen played for Tonga in their 2013 Rugby League World Cup campaign. Fisiiahi played in 2 of Tonga's 3 world cup matches. He scored his first international try against Scotland in Tonga's opening 26-24 match defeat. and scored another try in his second appearance, this time against pacific rivals Cook Islands in Tonga's 22–16 win.

2014
In February 2014, Fisiiahi was selected for the Warriors inaugural 2014 Auckland Nines squad. In Round 4 of the 2014 NRL season, Fisiiahi scored four tries against the Wests Tigers in the Warriors 42–18 victory at Westpac Stadium in Wellington. Fisiiahi's season was again ended early, this time suffering nerve damage to his shoulder (which necessitated a shoulder reconstruction) in Round 9 against the Cronulla-Sutherland Sharks at Remondis Stadium, in the Warriors 37–6 loss. Fisiiahi finished the Warriors 2014 NRL season with him playing in 5 matches and scoring 7 tries.

Rugby union career
In 2016, Fisiiahi switched to rugby union, joining the Chiefs and Counties Manukau, joining another former NRL player, Sonny Bill Williams, at the Chiefs.

References

External links
2015 New Zealand Warriors squad

1990 births
Living people
Auckland rugby league team players
Chiefs (rugby union) players
Ellerslie Eagles players
Junior Kiwis players
New Zealand sportspeople of Tongan descent
New Zealand Warriors players
People educated at Wesley College, Auckland
Rugby league fullbacks
Rugby league players from Auckland
Rugby league wingers
Rugby union players from Auckland
Tonga national rugby league team players